Juan Rodolfo Krone (born 18 March 1987) is a football defender from Paraguay.

Krone started his career in the youth divisions of Olimpia and made his professional debut in 2005. After alternating between the reserves squad and the first team Krone finally settled in the 2008 season under coach Gustavo Costas.

External links
 Juan Krone at BDFA.com.ar 

1987 births
Living people
Paraguayan footballers
Club Olimpia footballers
Association football defenders